The Alhóndiga of Toledo (Spain) dates from the beginning of the 17th century.

The alhóndigas, also called "alholíes", that in their Islamic origin were at the same time mesones and places for sale, happen to be almost all them, from the 16th century, local for exclusive storage and trade of wheat, ending up becoming official municipal centers almost always.

The original building, built between 1575 and 1582, completely collapsed in 1593.

In 1594, Nicolás de Vergara el Mozo drew a system of containment for the Miradero, afterwards proceeding to the reconstruction of the Alhóndiga, which concluded in 1536.

The Alhóndiga has had very different uses throughout history, from the French military warehouse, which was during the Peninsular War, to the bus station, which was recently.

Description 
It is a rectangular floor construction, simple and eminently functional; Is rather closed to the outside, by the matter of grain storage. A series of strong pillars, cruciform in cross section, composed of pebble stones in its bases, distribute the interior space of the building in a series of naves, of enjalbegados elevations.

Outwardly, on a stony base the walls are erected, mixed brick, brick-masonry, the rafters of this latter material being true boxes, uniform distribution in the walls.

The two facades of the building were coupled to it in 1960, coming from the Toledan convento de los Trinitarios Calzados; These are Plateresque portals, thinned; One with tympanum on the lintel and both with the cross of the Trinitarian Order.

References 
This article is a derivative of the provision relating to the process of declaration or initiation of a Property of Cultural Interest published in Official Gazette No. 305 on December 19, 1996 (text), which is free of known restrictions under the right of author in accordance with the provisions of article 13 of the Spanish Intellectual Property Law.

Bien de Interés Cultural landmarks in the Province of Toledo
Buildings and structures in Toledo, Spain
Alhóndigas